Gervaise  is a 1956 French film directed by René Clément based on the 1877 novel L'Assommoir by Émile Zola. It depicts a working-class woman in the mid-nineteenth century (played by Maria Schell) trying to cope with the descent of her husband (played by François Périer) into alcoholism. The film was nominated for the Best Foreign Language Film at the 29th Academy Awards. Schell won the Volpi Cup for Best Actress at the 1956 Venice Film Festival for her performance. It won the 1957 BAFTA for Best Film and Best Actor.

Cast

 Maria Schell: Gervaise Macquart Coupeau, a patient and courageous laundrywoman
 François Périer: Coupeau, Gervaise's husband, a roofer
 Suzy Delair: Virginie Poisson, an old rival who hates Gervaise
 Armand Mestral: Lantier, Gervaise's former lover
 Jany Holt: Mme Lorilleux, Coupeau's ill-tempered sister
 Mathilde Casadesus: Mme Boche, the concierge
 Florelle: Maman Coupeau, Coupeau's aged mother
 Micheline Luccioni: Clémence, a laundrywoman who works with Gervaise
 Lucien Hubert: Monsieur Poisson, a policeman and Virginie's husband
 Jacques Harden: Goujet, a smith, a friend of Coupeau and Gervaise's
 Jacques Hilling: Monsieur Boche, the concierge's husband
 Hélène Tossy: Mme Bijard
 Amédée: Mes Bottes, Coupeau's drinking buddy
 Hubert de Lapparent (as Hubert Lapparent): Monsieur Lorilleux, a chainmaker, Mme Lorilleux' long-suffering husband
 Rachel Devirys: Mme Fauconnier 
 Jacqueline Morane: Mme Gaudron
 Yvonne Claudie: Mme Putois
 Georges Paulais: Father Bru
 Gérard Darrieu: Charles, laundry worker
 Pierre Duverger: Monsieur Gaudron
 Marcelle Féry: Laundry owner
 Denise Péronne: a laundrywoman
 Simone Duhart: a fishmonger
 André Wasley: Father Colombe
 Ariane Lancell: Adèle
 Aram Stéphan: the mayor
 Georges Peignot: Monsieur Madinier
 Max Elbèze: Zidore
 Jean Relet: Sergent de ville (policeman)
 Roger Dalphin: worker
 Armand Lurville: presiding officer at hearing
 Jean Gautrat: Bec Salé
 Christian Denhez: Étienne, Gervaise and Lantier's younger son, at the age of 8
 Christian Férez: Étienne at the age of 13
 Patrice Catineaud: Claude, Gervaise and Lantier's elder son, at the age of 6
 Chantal Gozzi: Nana, Gervaise and Coupeau's daughter, at the age of 5
 Michèle Caillaud: Lalie
 Gilbert Sanjakian: the Boches' son at the age of 6
 Yvette Cuvelier: Augustine, apprentice at the laundry, at the age of 13
 Paul Préboist: member of the audience at the cabaret
 Jacques Bertrand: factory foreman

See also 

L'Assommoir
 List of submissions to the 29th Academy Awards for Best Foreign Language Film
 List of French submissions for the Academy Award for Best Foreign Language Film

References

External links 
 
 

1956 films
1950s historical drama films
French historical drama films
Films set in the 19th century
1950s French-language films
French black-and-white films
Films directed by René Clément
Films based on works by Émile Zola
Films based on French novels
Films scored by Georges Auric
Best Film BAFTA Award winners
Films with screenplays by Jean Aurenche
Films with screenplays by Pierre Bost
Films about alcoholism
1956 drama films
1950s French films